Jay Michaelson (born May 5, 1971) is an American writer, professor, rabbi, and podcast host. He is a writer for New York magazine, Rolling Stone, and other publications, having been the legal affairs columnist at The Daily Beast for eight years, and is an editor and podcast host at Ten Percent Happier, a meditation app and podcast network.

Legal and political writing 

Since 2013, Michaelson's journalistic work has focused largely on the Supreme Court, religion, and LGBT issues. Michaelson twice won the New York Society for Professional Journalists award for opinion writing, most recently in 2014.  In addition to covering the Supreme Court, he has written on climate change, antisemitism, voter suppression, judicial nominations, and other subjects, and has been featured on CNN, MSNBC, and Meet the Press.  His 1998 Stanford Environmental Law Journal article on geoengineering and climate change, described as "seminal" by Salon was the first legal analysis of geoengineering in legal academic literature.

In 2013, Michaelson wrote the first long-form report on the right-wing religious exemptions movement, Redefining Religious Liberty: The Covert Campaign Against Civil Rights. Michaelson's work on this issue gained prominence a year later after the Hobby Lobby Supreme Court case and he has written many articles on religious liberty in Reuters, The Washington Post and other publications.

From 2004 to 2017, Michaelson was a columnist and contributing editor to The Forward newspaper.  In 2009, his essay entitled "How I'm Losing My Love for Israel" generated substantial controversy in the Jewish world, including responses from Daniel Gordis, and Jonathan Sarna, and prefigured the estrangement of progressive American Jews from the government of Israel.  Michaelson was listed in the Forward 50 list of the most influential American Jews in 2009.

Meditation teaching 

Michaelson teaches meditation in Buddhist, Jewish, and secular contexts and has written several books on the subject.  Since 2018 has taught, edited, and written for the Ten Percent Happier meditation platform, where he now hosts the "Teacher Talks" podcast. He is also a teacher of jhāna meditation in the Theravādan Buddhist lineage of Ayya Khema and Michaelson's teacher Leigh Brasington and co-leads Jewish meditation retreats at the Isabella Freedman Jewish Retreat Center. Michaelson has written several books on meditation and spirituality and was ordained as a rabbi in 2013. He is an occasional contributor to Tricycle: The Buddhist Review.

LGBTQ Activism 

Michaelson is a rabbi and openly gay and was a professional religious LGBTQ activist from 2004 to 2013. He was the founder and executive director of Nehirim, an LGBTQ Jewish organization, from 2004 to 2013.  His 2009 book God vs. Gay? The Religious Case for Equality was an Amazon bestseller and Lambda Literary Award finalist, and Michaelson spoke at over 100 places of worship during the 2009–15 debates about same-sex marriage. Michaelson was called one of the "Most Inspiring LGBT Religious Leaders" in 2011 by The Huffington Post and one of "Our Religious Allies" by the LGBT newspaper The Advocate.

In 2014, Michaelson co-directed a project at The Daily Beast entitled Quorum: Global LGBT Voices, which features TED-style talks by LGBT leaders from the Global South.

Academic work 

Michaelson holds a PhD in Jewish Thought from Hebrew University of Jerusalem, where he wrote his dissertation on the antinomian heretic Jacob Frank.  His book on Frank, The Heresy of Jacob Frank: From Jewish Messianism to Esoteric Myth, will be published by Oxford University Press in September 2022.  He is an affiliated assistant professor at Chicago Theological Seminary and a visiting fellow at the Center for LGBTQ and Gender Studies in Religion. He previously held teaching positions at Boston University and Yale University.

Michaelson graduated from Columbia College of Columbia University in 1993, and from Yale Law School in 1997. His academic work includes "Queering Martin Buber: Harry Hay's Erotic Dialogical" (Shofar, 2018), "Conceptualizing Jewish Antinomianism in the 'Words of the Lord' by Jacob Frank" (Modern Judaism, 2017); "The Repersonalization of God: Monism and Theological Polymorphism in Zoharic and Hasidic Imagination" (Imagining the Jewish God, 2016), "Queer Theology and Social Transformation Twenty Years after Jesus ACTED UP" (Theology and Sexuality, 2015), "Rethinking Regulatory Reform: Toxics, Politics and Ethics" (Yale Law Journal, 1998), and "On Listening to the Kulturkampf, Or, How America Overruled Bowers v. Hardwick, Even Though Romer v. Evans Didn’t" (Duke Law Journal, 2000).

Books 
God in Your Body: Kabbalah, Mindfulness and Embodied Spiritual Practice (2006)
Another Word for Sky: Poems (2007)
Everything is God: The Radical Path of Nondual Judaism (2009)
God vs. Gay?: The Religious Case for Equality (2011)
Evolving Dharma: Meditation, Buddhism, and the Next Generation of Enlightenment (2013)
The Gate of Tears: Sadness and the Spiritual Path (2015)
Enlightenment by Trial and Error (2019)
The Heresy of Jacob Frank: From Jewish Messianism to Esoteric Myth (2022)

References 

1971 births
Boston University faculty
American gay writers
Jewish American writers
LGBT Jews
Living people
HuffPost writers and columnists
American spiritual writers
Radical Faeries members
Columbia College (New York) alumni
Yale Law School alumni